Arhopala dispar or frosted oakblue, is a butterfly in the family Lycaenidae. It was described by Norman Denbigh Riley and Edward John Godfrey in 1921. It is found in the Indomalayan realm.

Subspecies
A. d. dispar Thailand, Burma
A. d. pendleburyi Corbet, 1941 Peninsular Malaya

References

External links
Arhopala Boisduval, 1832 at Markku Savela's Lepidoptera and Some Other Life Forms. Retrieved June 3, 2017.

Arhopala
Butterflies described in 1921